Occupation commonly refers to:

Occupation (human activity), or job, one's role in society, often a regular activity performed for payment
Occupation (protest), political demonstration by holding public or symbolic spaces
Military occupation, the martial control of a territory
Occupancy, use of a building

Occupation or The Occupation may also refer to:

Arts and entertainment
Occupation (2018 film), an Australian film
Occupation (2021 film), a Czech comedy drama film
Occupation (TV series), a 2009 British drama about the Iraq War
"Occupation" (Battlestar Galactica), a 2006 television episode
"The Occupation" (Star Wars Rebels), a 2017 television episode
The Occupation, a 2019 video game
The Occupation, a 2019 novel by Deborah Swift

See also
Career, a course through life
Employment, a relationship wherein a person serves of another by hire
Job (disambiguation)
Occupy (disambiguation)
Position (disambiguation)
Profession, a vocation
Standard Occupational Classification System
Vocation, an occupation to which a person is specially drawn